Unsolved crime is covered by several articles:
 Clearance rate
 Cold case
 List of unsolved deaths